Vatau Mefi Hui (born 1970) is a Tongan politician and former Cabinet Minister.

Hui worked in the education sector, as an assistant teacher at Niuatoutapu High School, then for the Ministry of Education and Tonga Institute of Education. He was first elected to the Legislative Assembly of Tonga as part of the Democratic Party of the Friendly Islands's landslide victory at the 2017 Tongan general election. In May 2018 he pleaded guilty to failing to submit a report of his electoral expenses and was fined US$129.

Following the death of ʻAkilisi Pōhiva Hui supported Pohiva Tuʻiʻonetoa for Prime Minister, leaving the DPFI to join Tuʻiʻonetoa's new People's Party. He was subsequently appointed to Tuʻiʻonetoa's Cabinet as Minister for Internal Affairs.

He was re-elected in the 2021 election, but not reappointed to Cabinet.

References

1970 births
Living people
Members of the Legislative Assembly of Tonga
Government ministers of Tonga
Democratic Party of the Friendly Islands politicians
Tongan schoolteachers